is a passenger railway station located in the city of Ishioka, Ibaraki Prefecture, Japan operated by the East Japan Railway Company (JR East).

Lines 
Ishioka Station is served by the Joban Line, and is located 80.0 km from the official starting point of the line at Nippori Station. It also used to be the terminal for the Kashima Railway Line until the line closed on 31 March 2007.

Station layout 
The station consists of one side platform and one island platform, connected to the station building by a footbridge. The station has a "Midori no Madoguchi" staffed ticket office.

Platforms 

There was also a platform and depot for the Kashima Railway Line, from 1922 until it closed on 31 March 2007.

History 
The station opened on 4 November 1895. The station was absorbed into the JR East network upon the privatization of the Japanese National Railways (JNR) on 1 April 1987.

Passenger statistics 
In fiscal 2019, the station was used by an average of 5591 passengers daily (boarding passengers only).

Surrounding area

Ishioka City Hall
Ishioka No1. High School
There is a bus service from here to Ibaraki Airport, Hokota Station and Shin-Hokota Station.

See also 
 List of railway stations in Japan

References

External links 

 JR East station information 

Railway stations in Ibaraki Prefecture
Jōban Line
Railway stations in Japan opened in 1895
Ishioka, Ibaraki